Navajo Pine High School is a public high school in Navajo, New Mexico. It is a part of Gallup-McKinley County Schools.

The school was established in 1986. By July, Tom Arviso of the Navajo Times stated that the likely rumor was that the warrior was chosen as the high school mascot, even though the school itself did not yet make an announcement on this.

Curriculum
As of 2021 it includes a personal finance class and is one of two New Mexico high schools to require students to pass such a class.

Demographics
In 1987, according to a school counselor, the majority of the ethnic Navajo students at the school followed the majority American culture and do not follow traditional Navajo culture, and a portion of them did not have fluency in the Navajo language.

References

External links
 Navajo Pine High School

Public high schools in New Mexico
Schools in McKinley County, New Mexico
1986 establishments in New Mexico
Educational institutions established in 1986
Education on the Navajo Nation